Rev. George Mathen Mission Hospital aka GMM Hospital is a 70-bed hospital  
located in Mallappally East, a small town of Pathanamthitta District in the South Indian state of Kerala. It caters to the population of both Mallappally as well as nearby towns and villages such as Keezhvaipur and Padimon.
It was established in memory of Rev. George Mathen of the 19th century AD and is managed by the CSI church.

GMM Hospital has the stated objective to operate on a non-profit, charity basis  and render medical services to the public in General Medicine as well as specialist consultancy and treatment.

History
The hospital was established in memory of Rev. George Mathen (aka Geevarghese Kathanar) a famous priest and renowned Malayalam grammarian and littérateur of the 19th century, who wrote the first published grammar book in Malayalam and was also known for his care to the poor, needy and oppressed.

Today, the hospital is managed by the Diocese of Madhya Kerala of the Church of South India and is located close to the Holy Immanuel CSI Church, Mallappally.

Facilities and Services
The specialist departments offered by the hospital include Paediatrics, Cardiology, Orthopaedics, Emergency Medicine, Community Medicine and Dermatology.
The hospital also features the following facilities/services:
 Full-day Canteen (operating hours: 6 AM - 8 PM)
 24-hours Casualty (Accident and Emergency) Service
 24-hours Pharmacy
 24-hours Medical Laboratory
 24-hours X-ray facility
 24-hours Ambulance Service 
 24-hours Mortuary

References

Hospitals in Kerala
Christian hospitals
Hospitals established in 1971
1971 establishments in Kerala